Olav Sunde (17 August 1903 – 10 November 1985) was a javelin thrower from Oslo, Norway. He represented IK Tjalve.

He won the bronze medal at the 1928 Summer Olympics with a throw of 63.97 metres. At the 1932 Summer Olympics he finished ninth with 60.81 metres. In addition he won nine Norwegian championships between 1927 and 1937.

His personal best throw was 67.04 metres, achieved in June 1932 on Bislett stadion.

References

1903 births
1985 deaths
Athletes (track and field) at the 1928 Summer Olympics
Athletes (track and field) at the 1932 Summer Olympics
Olympic athletes of Norway
Olympic bronze medalists for Norway
Norwegian male javelin throwers
Medalists at the 1928 Summer Olympics
Olympic bronze medalists in athletics (track and field)
Athletes from Oslo